Faros is a village  at the southeast end of the island of Ikaria, Greece. It is located on a small plain home to many vineyards. Many consider Faros to be a tourist destination. Faros has taverns, quiet bars, cafes, and windsurfing. .

Near Faros are Drakano Fortress, the ancient third capital of Ikaria, close to Iero Beach, the Cave of Dionysos, and a hilltop Italian Fortress from WWII.

References 

Populated places in Ikaria (regional unit)